The 1980 Individual Speedway Junior European Championship was the fourth edition of the European Under-21 Championships.

European final
July 20, 1980
 Pocking, Rottalstadion

References

1980
European Individual U-21
Speedway competitions in Germany
1980 in West German motorsport